Cheniphasma is a genus of stick insects in the tribe Necrosciini, erected by G.W.C. Ho in 2012.  Species have been recorded from China (Guangdong) and Vietnam.

Species
The Phasmida Species File lists:
 Cheniphasma fruhstorferi (Brunner von Wattenwyl, 1907) (synonym Menexenus fruhstorferi from Vietnam)
 Cheniphasma granulatum Ho, 2013
 Cheniphasma parvidentatum Ho, 2020
 Cheniphasma serrifemoralis Ho, 2012 - type species

References

External links

Phasmatodea genera
Phasmatodea of Asia
Lonchodidae